DHQ Hospital Gilgit ( is the largest hospital in Gilgit Baltistan, Pakistan providing tertiary care facilities. The hospital is being run by Health and Population Welfare Department, Government of Gilgit-Baltistan. The hospital currently has 200 beds which is being upgraded to 400 bed facility.

See also 
 List of hospitals in Pakistan

References 

Hospitals in Gilgit-Baltistan